Lindsay Bernard Hall (28 December 1859 – 14 February 1935) was an English-born Australian artist, teacher and art gallery director.

Early life and career

Hall was born at Garston, Liverpool, England, the son of a broker of the same family as Captain Basil Hall, writer of books of travel; his maternal grandfather was conductor J. Z. Herrmann. Hall was educated at Cheltenham College and grew up in an atmosphere of culture. He studied painting at the South Kensington School of Art, Antwerp and Munich, and worked for several years in London.

He exhibited at the Royal Academy and was one of the original members of the New English Art Club. He exhibited with the club in 1886 and 1887, along with Clausen, Sargent, Gotch, Kennington and others.

On the death of George Frederick Folingsby in 1891, he was appointed director of the National Gallery of Victoria and master of the School of Arts in Melbourne. He began his duties in March 1892. Hall married Elsinore Mary Shuter on 18 December 1894, however she died in 1901. He held the position at the Gallery for 43 years and many of the well-known painters of Australia were trained by him in the National Gallery of Victoria Art School.

Hall also acted as adviser to the trustees for purchases for the gallery and art museum, and when the munificent bequest of Alfred Felton was received in 1904 his responsibilities were much increased. In 1905 Hall went to England to make purchases under the bequest. After his return he was expected to advise on everything submitted that might find a place in an art museum and, although he never claimed to be an expert in all these things, he supplemented his knowledge with hard reading and made relatively few mistakes.

Works
Hall's own paintings were usually interiors, nudes, or paintings of still life. He was often represented at the Victorian Artists’ and other societies' exhibitions and held several one-man shows, but he was kept so busily employed as director and adviser, that his paintings had to be done at weekends and during vacations.

In February 1934 he again went to London as adviser to the Felton trustees and died there on 14 February 1935.

In 1912, Hall married a second time, this time to Harriet Grace Thomson, who with one son by the first marriage and two sons and a daughter by the second marriage, survived him.

Hall was a tall, distinguished man; courteous with strong convictions. He was extremely conservative in almost everything from his art to his politics. The only exception was his advocacy of the Baconian theory, afterwards modified to a firm conviction that whether Bacon had any hand in the plays or not, the author was not the man from Stratford. In other matters his appeal was to tradition and the expert. Hall was an honest man, he could see no merit in the so-called modern school of painting and he said so. Its followers seemed to him to violate the first principles of art. His own paintings were carefully planned and always well drawn. His colour was not always so good, and this was especially apparent in some of his earlier nudes.

The examples of his work in the Melbourne, Sydney and Adelaide galleries show him to have been a conscientious and excellent artist. As a teacher his somewhat cold manner, which really came from a kind of shyness, sometimes repelled his pupils in his earlier days, but he mellowed as he grew older. There has been much difference of opinion as to the value of his methods of teaching, but his long roll of distinguished pupils suggests that his insistence on sincerity, truth and good drawing, must have been of great value to them. In any case, Hall's personality was a strong influence for the good of art in his time.

Death and burial

He died in London on 14 February 1935 and was buried at Golders Green cemetery. Among those in attendance were Australian artists George Bell,  I.M. Cohen, James Quinn, Bess Tait and Marion Jones as well as British sculptors Gilbert Bayes and Lady Hilton Young.

References

Ann E. Galbally, 'Hall, Lindsay Bernard (1859 - 1935)', Australian Dictionary of Biography, Volume 9, MUP, 1983, pp 164–165. Retrieved 19 January 2009

External links
Bernard Hall Papers at the National Gallery of Australia Research Library

1859 births
1935 deaths
Australian people of English descent
19th-century Australian painters
20th-century Australian painters
Artists from Liverpool
Artists from Melbourne
19th-century English painters
Archibald Prize finalists
Australian art teachers
Australian portrait painters
Australian male painters
19th-century Australian male artists
20th-century Australian male artists
19th-century English male artists
English male painters